Scotland Township may refer to:

United Kingdom 
 Township (Scotland)

United States 
 Scotland Township, McDonough County, Illinois
 Scotland Township, Day County, South Dakota, in Day County, South Dakota

Township name disambiguation pages